Don Juan is a 1956 historical comedy film directed by John Berry and starring Fernandel, Carmen Sevilla and Roland Armontel. It was a co-production between France, Italy and Spain, based on the legend of Don Juan.

The film's sets were designed by the art directors Sigfrido Burmann and Georges Wakhévitch.

Cast
 Fernandel as Sganarelle  
 Carmen Sevilla as Serranilla  
 Erno Crisa as Don Juan  
 Fernando Rey as Don Iñigo  
 Roland Armontel as The Governor  
 Simone Paris as Doña María  
 Christine Carère as Doña Inés  
 José Sepúlveda as Don Ramón  
 Manolo Gómez Bur as Lebourreau  
 Robert Lombard as The Duke of Altaquerque  
 Micheline Dax as Doña Elvira  
 Teófilo Palou as Un Guardia  
 Pedro Valdivieso as Angel 
 Hebe Donay as Juanita  
 Mercedes Rueda as Lola 
 Matilde Artero
 Luis Torrecilla
 Juan Olaguivel as El Escudero  
 José María Rodríguez as Otro Guardia  
 Ángel Calero as Luis  
 Germaine Montero 
 Antonio Riquelme
 Claudine Bleuse
 Claude May

References

Bibliography 
 Klossner, Michael. The Europe of 1500-1815 on Film and Television: A Worldwide Filmography of Over 2550 Works, 1895 Through 2000. McFarland, 2002.

External links 
 

1956 films
1950s historical comedy films
French historical comedy films
Italian historical comedy films
Spanish historical comedy films
1950s French-language films
Films directed by John Berry
Films based on the Don Juan legend
Films set in Spain
Films set in the 17th century
1950s French films
1950s Italian films